The ASI has recognized 366 Monuments of National Importance in Lucknow circle of Uttar Pradesh. For technical reasons, this list of ASI recognized monuments in the Lucknow circle has been split into three lists: 
 Lalitpur district
 Northern districts in Lucknow circle: Ambedkar Nagar, Bahraich, Balrampur, Faizabad, Gonda, Hardoi, Kanpur, Kanpur Dehat, Kheri, Lucknow, Rae Bareli, Siddharth Nagar, Sravasti Nagar, Sultanpur and Unnao (this list)
 Southern districts in Lucknow circle: Allahabad, Banda, Chitrakut, Fatehpur, Hamirpur, Jalaun, Jhansi, Kaushambi and Mahoba

List of monuments 

|}

See also 
 List of Monuments of National Importance in Agra district
 List of Monuments of National Importance in Agra circle
 List of Monuments of National Importance in India for other Monuments of National Importance in India
 List of State Protected Monuments in Uttar Pradesh

References 

Uttar Pradesh, Lucknow circle North